The communauté de communes C.I.A.T.E. du Pays Creuse-Thaurion-Gartempe  was located in the Creuse département of the Limousin region of central France. It was created in January 1994. It was merged into the new Communauté de communes Creuse Sud Ouest in January 2017.

It comprised the following 27 communes:

Ahun
Banize
Chamberaud
La Chapelle-Saint-Martial
Chavanat
Le Donzeil
Fransèches
Janaillat
Maisonnisses
Mazeirat
Moutier-d’Ahun
Peyrabout
Pontarion
La Pouge
Saint-Avit-le-Pauvre
Saint-Éloi
Saint-Georges-la-Pouge
Saint-Hilaire-la-Plaine
Saint-Hilaire-le-Château
Saint-Martial-le-Mont
Saint-Michel-de-Veisse
Saint-Sulpice-les-Champs
Saint-Yrieix-les-Bois
Sardent
Sous-Parsat
Vidaillat
Thauron

See also
Communes of the Creuse department

References 

Creuse-Thaurion-Gartempe